Baherove is an urban-type settlement in Lenine Raion of the Autonomous Republic of Crimea, a territory recognized by a majority of countries as part of Ukraine and annexed by Russia as the Republic of Crimea. It lends its name to the nearby Baherove Air Base. Population:

Ancient Greek Settlement 
In 2018, archaeologists discovered a previously unknown ancient Greek settlement of the 4th-3rd centuries BC near the town of Baherove. According to the researchers, the settlement called Manitra. On the territory of the settlement the remains of a rectangular tower were discovered. Near the settlement, a necropolis which was not plundered was also found. During the excavation of the necropolis, fragments of black pottery were found, which indicates the prosperity of the settlement. Among the finds were a lot of coins, as well as monetary and hoard of artifacts. Scientists believe that Manitra could be a royal emporium (trading settlement) for trading cattle.

References

Urban-type settlements in Crimea
Lenine Raion
Greek colonies in Crimea